Bombus lapidarius is a species of bumblebee in the subgenus Melanobombus. Commonly known as the red-tailed bumblebee, B. lapidarius can be found throughout much of Central Europe. Known for its distinctive black and red body, this social bee is important in pollination.

Taxonomy and phylogeny
The red-tailed bumblebee is a part of the order Hymenoptera, family Apidae, and the genus Bombus, which includes many species including Bombus terrestris , Bombus lucorum, and Bombus hypnorum.

Description and identification

The red-tailed bumblebee is typically distinguished by its black body with red markings around the abdomen. Worker females and the queen look similar, except the queen is much larger than the worker females. Males typically have both the red and black coloration along with a yellow band around the abdomen and yellow markings on the face. Further, B. lapidarius tend to have a medium-sized proboscis, which is significant in that it allows the species to be a good pollinator. These bees do not typically form extensive or complex colonies. Nests usually only contain a few hundred bees, at most. An average colony consists of about 100 to 200 worker bees.

Distribution and habitat
Bombus lapidarius is often found throughout Europe, including Britain and Ireland as well as parts of Greece, Germany, Sweden and Finland. This species typically has a fairly wide distribution. As described in the foraging patterns section, they can fly over 1500 meters to better forage for food. They typically are found in temperate regions. Further, colonies are often found in open terrain.

B. lapidarius nests have been found in many different habitats, but the bees typically prefer open terrain as opposed to more heavily forested landscapes.

Colony cycle
Red-tailed bumblebees typically appear in the summer months of June, July, and August. Colonies are initiated via the queen, where workers and males follow roles to keep the colony thriving. Though there is a hierarchy between the queen and the rest of the colony, there does not appear to be a hierarchy between the workers themselves.

Behavior

Brood
Social bees, including Bombus lapidarius, are able to produce a great deal of heat due to contraction of their thoracic flight muscles. They are then able to use this heat to help warm and incubate their brood. This also allows them to help regulate the temperature of the nest generally.

Courtship behavior
Red-tailed bumblebee males utilise sexual pheromones to attract females. Males will fly around and mark spots with the pheromone compounds (Z)-9-hexadecenol and hexadecanal via their labial gland. These secretions are highly species specific, thus likely greatly reduce inter-species mating. B. lapidarius typically fly and secrete above the treetops, which are more affected by the effects of the wind and the sun. Therefore, this species typically has to secrete more pheromone than other species to be effective. Further, these compounds were found in trace amounts in the air around the areas that individuals had scent marked. Different populations differing in location (specifically Southern Italy, the Balkans, and Centre-Eastern Europe) have experienced genetic differentiation in pheromone composition.

Pheromones
Chemicals are often emitted from the bees via the cephalic labial gland, called pheromones. B. lapidarius pheromones are believed to be “precopulatory signals”, or are used in an attempt to attract mates. These secreted signals are species-specific. These pheromones are often copied by cuckoo species, described in further detail in the parasite subsection. 
Queen red-tailed bumblebees also appear to secrete pheromones. Functionally, these pheromones appear to inhibit ovarian development in worker bees. Although it is still unclear what the true function of the queen’s pheromones are, the pheromones that are secreted are chemically quite different than those of the workers.

Sex allocation
As the red-tailed bumblebee is a member of the Hymenoptera order, the bee displays interesting sex allocation tactics. Studies have suggested that workers control sex allocation, not the queen. As such, Hymenoptera are known for having haploid males and diploid females.

Foraging patterns
B. lapidarius has been found to be a fairly dominant species in foraging and have been found to travel as far as 1750 meters to forage for resources such as Phacelia tenuifolia. however, it appears that individual bumblebees vary greatly in distance traveled in foraging efforts. Although there were differences in foraging for each individual bee as well as for each species, studies suggest that B. lapidarius are willing to travel very large distances. In fact, these bees appear to be able to travel 11.5 kilometers away from their nests. One study extensively studied foraging behavior in B. lapidarius. In an almost barren, treeless basin in Germany, the study found nests of the red-tailed bumblebee as well as two other Bombus species within one hundred meters of each other. Each species had equal resource availability. Researchers marked the foraging bees, with almost 80% of all of the foraging bees eventually marked for study. It was found that foraging time was greatest at around a five hundred meter radius around the nest, but time decreased as distance increased past the five hundred meter mark. Further, flight distance was very different among different individuals, reinforcing the idea that specific bees are bred for specific jobs, and that some are more skilled than others. Outside of the differences between individual bees, differences between species were found as well. B. lapidarius, for example, was found to typically be foraging around the five hundred meter radius mark, but some individuals ranged much farther than this, reaching distances as far as 1,500 meters away from the nest. Further, the red-tailed bumblebee displayed high “patch fidelity”, indicating that an individual bee was likely to return to a specific location. This species of bee thus can loosely be described as a “long distance forager”, but does not travel as far as some other Bombus species, so it is typically described as having an intermediate foraging distance. Further, the study noted that body size appeared to be a factor in how far a bee might be willing to travel and concluded that understanding of foraging distance would differ most between species, and therefore foraging distance appears to be described on the species level.

Males and workers
Males have been found to travel a much greater range than workers. This behavior may help lead to greater genetic variation, as populations appear to be diverse and avoid inbreeding. Workers, in comparison, tend to stay closer to the nest. Workers are often invested in cell building within the nest. Furthermore, B. lapidarius workers do not appear to have a hierarchy between them, which differs from many other species. Workers typically build cells, while the queen asserts her dominance over each egg cell. However, as B. lapidarius workers often eat the queen’s eggs, as described in the parasite subsection, this decreases the queen’s dominance over her workers. Further, workers that are more aggressive were found to be more likely to have ovaries, as well.

Diet
Red-tailed bumblebees typically eat pollen and nectar. Workers will sometimes attempt to eat the eggs that the queen has laid. The queen makes a valiant effort to prevent this from happening, but the workers are frequently successful in this attempt. Though the queen would not attempt to hurt or injure workers engaging in this activity, she does threaten them with her mandible or sometimes hits the workers with her head. Though this is not well understood, it provides an interesting question for further study.

Further, bees are found to move between specific species of flower, but ignore other species that could be equally as rewarding. 
One study showed that these bees will stay at a particular flower or food source longer with increased levels of nectar available. However, time at any particular flower did not change with different levels of pollen.

Interaction with other species

Parasites
Bombus lapidarius often experiences parasites, including different species from the Psithyrus subgenus which attempt to usurp its nest.  All cuckoo bumblebee species lack a worker caste - instead the female queen cuckoo bee invades the nest of a host species and lay her eggs there.  These cuckoo bees utilize different mechanisms via chemical recognition systems, including mimicry and repulsion, to invade B. lapidarius nests. By mimicking both physical traits as well as chemical secretions, cuckoos have evolved to mimic B. lapidarius species in particular. Typically, species avoid cuckoo parasitism by emitting complex hydrocarbons. These hydrocarbons are how species such as the red-tailed bumblebee recognize each other. However, cuckoos are able to copy these hydrocarbons in order to introduce themselves into a host colony. However, if cuckoos do not match the B. lapidarius traits in these ways, parasitism can still be achieved via repulsion. Cuckoos can produce a worker repellent, thus again allowing the parasitic species to survive within the group. Hosts either raise these cuckoos as their own, or cuckoos invade and become a part of the B. lapidarius colony. Occasionally, Psithyrus queens eat B. lapidarius eggs if her own brood is becoming nutritionally deficient.

Mutualism
Red-tailed bumblebees are very important for pollination for many different species of flower and crops. Further, B. lapidarius was found to forage and pollinate at higher temperatures than other Bombus species. This is important for understanding when and where pollination will most likely occur.

Human importance

Stings
This species is a type of bumblebee, and thus has the ability to sting.

Agriculture
This bee is a very important part of pollination. For many species of plant, such as species of Viscaria, only bees and butterflies have proboscides long enough to pollinate effectively. For example, studies show B. lapidarius was more numerous and had a higher feeding density than other species studied. Further, Bombus lapidarius is important in pollinating many other species, including Centaurea scabiosa. A study found that though Apis mellifera was also involved in pollination of this species, B. lapidarius greatly outnumbers Apis and other bee species in number and importance in pollination. Though initially attracted to flowers by the color, the scent is what drives attention as the bees approach flowers. it has been suggested that some individuals are better able to interpret differences in scent in the flowers than others. It has been suggested that these differences in ability developed evolutionarily as different types of bees developed specific roles within the colony. How long a bee stays at a particular flower seems to be connected to behavior, as it appeared the bees assumed low pollen reward, despite increased pollen levels in experiments. However, the amount of pollen transferred in a visit from B. lapidarius was only affected by the amount of pollen in the flower that individual was at. Further, it appeared that variation in duration of visits to different flowers was related to differences in foraging speed, not differences in how well the bee was able to remove nectar. 
Bees will typically forage in patches, but show no clear directionality in their foraging. Further, pollinating bees will usually visit the nearest neighboring plants, thus gene flow between plants tends to be pretty limited. 
Other experiments also indicated that body size is an important factor in how bumblebees pollinate. It would appear that size affects how often the bee will visit flowers as well as how well the bee could pollinate. Smaller bees seem to pollinate more effectively than larger bees. Yet, there did not appear to be a correlation between floral display size and body size. Therefore, it was suggested that bumblebees of all different sizes respond in the same way to floral display size.

Conservation status
Red-tailed bumblebees rank among the most common and most recognized bumblebees of Central Europe, but rarer species have similar appearances, such as Bombus ruderarius.

This species is widespread across Ireland, though some evidence indicates that the species is declining in agricultural grasslands. It is considered Near Threatened in Ireland.

Further, it has been suggested that different species of bumblebee understand their surroundings according to different scales. This leads to important implications for conservation - the differences in species action is significant in understanding resource range and differences in foraging areas. Understanding of these concepts is vital in conservation efforts in order to help create an environment that is good for many different bee species. Thus, these bees specifically are very important to agriculture, as they are so important in pollination. Therefore, conservation of B. lapidarius is important to understand.

References

Bumblebees
Hymenoptera of Europe
Bees described in 1758
Taxa named by Carl Linnaeus